Tartar was built in France in 1779, probably under another name, and taken in prize. She was in 1781 briefly a Bristol-based privateer. A French privateer captured her, but a British privateer recaptured her. She then became the merchantman Friends, and traded between Bristol and North America, primarily Newfoundland. Friends was last listed in 1793.

Career
Tartar first appeared in Lloyd's Register (LR), in 1781. She underwent fitting at Hilhouse, where she was fitted with sails to be able to sail as a lugger or schooner. Her first master was Aaron Floyd, who had been master on an earlier Bristol privateer named . Captain Aaron Floyd acquired a letter of marque on 10 February 1781.

Lloyd's List reported in March 1781 that the privateer Phoenix, of Dartmouth, Captain Pidgely, had captured a brig from Mauritius and recaptured the Bristol privateer Tartar, and brought them both into Penzance. Phoenix and Tartar had sailed from Bristol together on 19 March. The French privateer was Black Princess.

Tartar was offered for sale at Falmouth in September.

Tartar then came under new ownership. Captain Doyle purchased her, renamed her Friends, and  started sailing her between Bristol and Newfoundland. 

By 1786 Friends was sailing between Bristol and Philadelphia, as well as Newfoundland. She underwent repairs in 1788.

Fate
Friends was last listed in 1793.

Notes

Citations

References
 
 

1779 ships
Ships built in France
Captured ships
Privateer ships of Great Britain
Age of Sail merchant ships of England